Razhana Buttress (‘Rid Razhana’ \'rid r&-'zha-na\ is the ice-covered buttress rising to 2000 m on the west side of Detroit Plateau on Danco Coast in Graham Land, Antarctica.  It is situated between tributaries to Lilienthal, Mouillard and Sikorsky Glaciers, and has steep and partly ice-free southwest slopes.

The buttress is named after the settlement of Razhana in Western Bulgaria.

Location
British mapping in 1978.

Maps
British Antarctic Territory. Scale 1:200000 topographic map. DOS 610 Series, Sheet W 64 60. Directorate of Overseas Surveys, Tolworth, UK, 1978.
 Antarctic Digital Database (ADD). Scale 1:250000 topographic map of Antarctica. Scientific Committee on Antarctic Research (SCAR). Since 1993, regularly upgraded and updated.

Notes

References
 Bulgarian Antarctic Gazetteer. Antarctic Place-names Commission. (details in Bulgarian, basic data in English)
 Razhana Buttress. SCAR Composite Gazetteer of Antarctica

External links
 Razhana Buttress. Copernix satellite image

Mountains of Graham Land
Bulgaria and the Antarctic
Danco Coast